Mount Buller is primarily a resort town on the slopes of Mount Buller in the Shire of Mansfield of the Australian state of Victoria. It is popular with snowsports enthusiasts in winter due to its proximity to Melbourne. In the warmer months it is popular with visitors to the Victorian Alps and bike riders.

Mount Buller village
 The town has around 7000 beds available in accommodation facilities, the most of any Victorian ski resort. La Trobe University had a minor campus at Mount Buller. The campus facilities included a public cinema, gym and indoor sporting facilities. La Trobe has vacated the mountain, however the Resort Management Board is now using the building, better known as the Mount Buller Community Centre, as its home. All facilities are still operational, with the cinema, gym and sports hall open all year round.  Mount Buller is also the home of the National Alpine Museum.

The area between Mount Buller and Mount Stirling is the primary catchment for the Delatite River.

Sports and recreation

Mountain biking
Mount Buller is home to a growing number of first class Cross Country and Downhill mountain bike tracks. Between 2009 and 2012 many trails have been added, modified and upgraded by WORLD TRAIL. The chairlift for the downhill tracks is only open during the summer from Boxing Day until the end of January, although trailer shuttles also run until the end of February. Mt Buller is working towards developing the mountain as a world class mountain bike venue in line with what has been achieved at Whistler (Canada) and Queenstown (New Zealand). Retail outlets exist in the mountain village to enable casual riders to hire pushbikes, and for bike owners to access service should the need arise. The Victorian Downhill State Series holds a race each year at Mt Buller, as does the MTBA National Series.

The International Mountain Bicycling Association has designated the mountain biking trails at Mount Buller as a bronze-level IMBA Ride Center.  Ride Centers are the IMBA's strongest endorsement of a trail experience.

Road cycling
Mount Buller is also a popular destination for road cyclists, due to the challenging climb from the tollbooth in Mirimbah to the Mount Buller Village. The final kilometre before the Village is the steepest part of the climb with several short sections of gradient 10%+.

Skiing, snowboarding, and hiking

Comprising , the Mount Buller Alpine Resort is a year-round facility with peak operation during winter months for alpine sports. In the summer months, the area is a popular location for alpine hiking.

Geography

Climate
Mount Buller has a hemiboreal climate. Under the Köppen climate classification scheme, it has a Subpolar oceanic climate (Köppen: Cfc) with cool summers and cold, very snowy winters. On average, Mount Buller receives 67.6 snowy days annually, the greatest figure for any mainland Australian site.

On February 3 2023, Mount Buller reached a top of just .

References

Towns in Victoria (Australia)
Shire of Mansfield
Mountains of Victoria (Australia)
Victorian Alps
Unincorporated areas of Victoria (Australia)